Catherine or Catharine Baker may refer to:
Catherine Baker Knoll (1930–2008), lieutenant governor of Pennsylvania
Catherine Baker (journalist) (born 1947), French journalist and unschooling essayist
Catharine Baker (born 1971), American politician formerly serving in the California State Assembly
Cathy Baker (actress) (born 1947), American actress known for Hee Haw
Cathy Baker (field hockey) (born 1957), New Zealand field hockey player
Kate Baker (Catherine Baker, 1861–1953), teacher and literary guardian of Joseph Furphy's works

See also
Kathy Baker (born 1950), American stage, film and television actress
Kathy Guadagnino (born 1961), American golfer who played under her maiden name of Kathy Baker
Katie Baker (born 1984), Canadian field hockey player
Baker (surname)